Chaharborj County is in West Azerbaijan province, Iran. The capital of the county is the city of Chahar Borj. At the 2006 National Census, the region's population (as the former Marhemetabad District of Miandoab County) was 23,700 in 5,718 households. The following census in 2011 counted 25,814 people in 7,135 households. At the 2016 census, the district's population was 26,219 in 7,797 households. Marhemetabad District was separated from Miandoab County, elevated to the status of Chaharborj County, and divided into two districts in 2020.

Administrative divisions

The population history of Chaharborj County's administrative divisions (as a district of Miandoab County) over three consecutive censuses is shown in the following table.

References

Counties of West Azerbaijan Province

fa:شهرستان چهاربرج